The 1941 Traktor Stalingrad season was the 6th season in USSR championships.

Squad 

 (captain)

Transfers

In:

Out:

Competitions

Friendlies

USSR Championship. Group A

Note: The championship was not completed because of the Great Patriotic War.

Table

Statistics

Squad Statistics

Appearances and goals

|}

Top Scorers

General Statistics

Sources
 
 

FC Rotor Volgograd seasons
Traktor Stalingrad
1941 in Soviet football